"Born to Be Yours" is a song written and performed by Norwegian music producer Kygo and American band Imagine Dragons. Produced by Kygo, it was released by Sony and Ultra Music on 15 June 2018. It is included on the international deluxe edition of Imagine Dragons' fourth studio album Origins. The song is featured in the second trailer for the 2020 computer-animated film Scoob! based on the popular Scooby-Doo franchise.

Release and background
On 11 June 2018, Kygo teased the collaboration on social media with a picture of him and all members from Imagine Dragons, captioning the post with a musical notes emoji. He revealed the song's artwork the following day. On 14 June, both artists posted an audio preview and a release date for the song on social media. "'Born to Be Yours' feels to me like the perfect combination of my sound mixed with the band's iconic elements and vocals," Kygo said of the song in a statement. "Imagine Dragons are one of my favorite bands and it's an honor to finally let everyone hear what we've been working on."

Composition
"Born to Be Yours" is an EDM song that modelled on radio rock with a slight element of folk. The song features "a chill electronic beat", accompanied by "hand claps and acoustic guitars". It was described as "a genre-defying amalgamation of Kygo's signature melodies and typical Imagine Dragons' instrumentals as well as Dan Reynolds' celestial voice".

Critical reception
Matthew Meadow of Your EDM praised the song, calling it "a deliciously sweet song that absolutely hits the spot". He regarded the track as "the perfect combination of both artists' sounds", writing that "Kygo's production blends seamlessly with the acoustic guitar strums and Reynolds' voice". Ryan Castillo of Dancing Astronaut described the song as a representation of "the perfect artistic synergy between the American band's unmistakable vocal quality and Kygo's melodic tropical chord progressions". He noted the song's most refreshing feature as the integration of elements from Kygo's musical roots, and concluded by deeming the track a "balanced, deeply moving, and impressively chill" collaboration.

Music video 
The music video is directed by Matt Eastin and Aaron Hymes, and involves a civilized sasquatch falling in love with someone, only to realize she is a hunter, however, he is saved by another Sasquatch. The Sasquatch is played by Joshua James and Michael S. Fritchen aka “The Fritchenator” plays the hick with the “No Squatches” sign. It was filmed in Utah.

Personnel
Credits adapted from Tidal.
 Kygo – production
 Dan Reynolds – vocals
 Serban Ghenea – mix engineering
 Randy Merrill – master engineering

Charts

Weekly charts

Year-end charts

Certifications

References

External links
 

2018 singles
2018 songs
Imagine Dragons songs
Kygo songs
Song recordings produced by Kygo
Songs containing the I–V-vi-IV progression
Songs written by Ben McKee
Songs written by Dan Reynolds (musician)
Songs written by Daniel Platzman
Songs written by Kygo
Songs written by Wayne Sermon
Sony Music singles
Ultra Music singles